Luis Prais (24 February 1925 – 2 January 2005) was a Uruguayan footballer. He played in four matches for the Uruguay national football team in 1946. He was also part of Uruguay's squad for the 1946 South American Championship.

References

External links
 

1925 births
2005 deaths
Uruguayan footballers
Uruguay international footballers
Place of birth missing
Association football defenders
Peñarol players
FC Barcelona players
Uruguayan expatriate footballers
Expatriate footballers in Spain
Uruguayan football managers
Peñarol managers